Vice Admiral Sally Brice-O'Hara (born c. 1953) is an American woman who was the 27th Vice-Commandant of the U.S. Coast Guard.

Education
Brice-O'Hara attended Annapolis High School where one of her classmates was Bill Belichick. She graduated from Goucher College, where she earned a Bachelor of Arts degree in sociology in 1974. Brice-O'Hara received her Coast Guard commission from Officer Candidate School 1975. She received a Master of Arts degree in public administration from Harvard University, John F. Kennedy School of Government, and a Master of Science degree in national security strategy from the National War College.

Career
Her previous flag officer assignments include:
Commander, Coast Guard District Fourteen, Honolulu, Hawaii
Director, JIATF West, Honolulu, Hawaii
Director, Training and Reserve, Coast Guard Headquarters, Washington, DC
Commander, Coast Guard District Five, Portsmouth, Virginia

Her other assignments include:
Director of personnel management, Coast Guard Headquarters, Washington, DC
Commanding officer, Training Center Cape May, New Jersey, the Coast Guard's only recruit training program
Member, Commandant's Strategic Planning Staff, Coast Guard Headquarters, Washington, DC
Deputy commander, Coast Guard Activities Baltimore and alternate Captain of the Port, Baltimore, Maryland
Commander, Group Baltimore, Maryland
Officer assignment detailer,  Coast Guard Headquarters, Washington, DC
Planning officer, United States Coast Guard Support Center, Kodiak, Alaska
Commanding officer of Coast Guard Station, Cape May, New Jersey
Assistant director of admissions, United States Coast Guard Academy, New London, Connecticut
Executive officer of Coast Guard Station, New London, Connecticut
Fisheries and Law Enforcement duty officer, Coast Guard District Five, Portsmouth, Virginia

Deputy Commandant for Operations
Brice-O'Hara served as the deputy commandant for operations from 2008 to 2010.  She oversaw the strategic integration of operational missions and the optimization of policy development and mission execution consistent with the Coast Guard's national priorities.

Vice-Commandant
Brice-O'Hara was the 27th vice commandant of the United States Coast Guard. In a change of command ceremony on May 24, 2010, she relieved Vice Admiral David Pekoske. She was only the second woman to be vice-commandant, the first being Vice Admiral Vivien Crea. In a change of command ceremony on May 18, 2012, she was relieved as vice commandant by Vice Admiral John Currier.

Awards

Personal life 
Brice-O'Hara is a longtime resident of Annapolis, Maryland. Brice-O'Hara has two sons with her husband Robert O'Hara.

References

External links
Official USCG Biography

United States Coast Guard admirals
Living people
Recipients of the Legion of Merit
People from Annapolis, Maryland
Goucher College alumni
Harvard Kennedy School alumni
National War College alumni
Place of birth missing (living people)
1953 births
Vice Commandants of the United States Coast Guard
Recipients of the Coast Guard Distinguished Service Medal
Female admirals of the United States Coast Guard
21st-century American women